Muhammad Hayyat Khan was at one time president of Azad Kashmir, Pakistan.

References

Living people
Year of birth missing (living people)
Place of birth missing (living people)
Presidents of Azad Kashmir